Valdemorillo is a town and municipality located in the Community of Madrid. It had a population of 12,168 in 2016
It is located 42 km from the capital and 13 km from El Escorial.

History 
Since the late middle ages and up to the early 19th century, when it became part of the province of Madrid, Valdemorillo belonged to the land of Segovia, originally as part of the sexmo of Casarrubios.

Geography 
It limits the north with this locality, to the west with Robledo de Chavela and Navalagamella, to the east with Colmenarejo and to the south with Villanueva de la Cañada and Quijorna.

Among its main population centers are the urbanizations: Mojadillas, El Paraiso, Pino Alto, Jarabeltrán, Puentelasierra, Las Charquillas, La Esperanza, Montemorillo, Parque de las Infantas, La Pizarrera, Mirador del Romero, Mirador de Pino Alto, Los Barrancos , Valmayor and Cerro Alarcón I and II, the latter shared with Navalagamella. Its most important roads are the M-600, which connects El Escorial with Navalcarnero, and the M-510, which runs from Galapagar to Chapinería.

Valdemorillo is one of the maximum suppliers of drinking water in the Community of Madrid. In this town, part of the Valmayor reservoir is located, which also floods the municipalities of El Escorial and Colmenarejo. It is the second reservoir with the highest storage capacity in the Madrid region, after El Atazar.

Its term is partially included in the Regional Park of the middle course of the Guadarrama River and its surroundings. It is also part of the tourist itinerary known as the Imperial Route of the Community of Madrid, built around the roads used by Felipe II on his travels from Madrid to the Monastery of El Escorial.

See also 

 Imperial Route of the Community of Madrid

References 

Municipalities in the Community of Madrid